Van der Flier is a Dutch surname. Notable people with the surname include:

Cor van der Flier, Dutch cricketer
Henk van der Flier (born 1945), Dutch psychologist
Josh van der Flier (born 1993), Irish rugby union player
Julie van der Flier (born 1997), Irish cricketer

See also
 Flier (surname)